Envirochemie GmbH is a company that designs and manufactures wastewater treatment facilities. Envirochemie GmbH headquartered in Roßdorf, near Frankfurt/Main, Germany.

History
Envirochemie was founded in 1976 in Switzerland. The company began with the manufacture of compact treatment plants under the trade name Split-O-Mat. A year later, they started to build stationary treatment facilities using physico-chemical treatment. In 1987 the German branch of firm started wastewater treatment using membrane technologies. Since 1996 Envirochemie have applied biological methods in wastewater treatment and have relocated their headquarters to Germany. Since 2000, the company has created subsidiaries in several other countries. Currently, together with subsidiaries in Germany (EnviroFalk GmbH and EnviroDTS GmbH), Austria, Bulgaria, Great Britain, Morocco, the Netherlands, Poland, Russia, Switzerland, and the UAE.

Activity
Envirochemie is engaged in the engineering, construction, modernisation and servicing of industrial water treatment facilities. The company sells treatment facilities, spare parts and reagent for water treatment. Biological and physical-chemical methods, flotation and membrane technology are used. The company also offers compact treatment facilities.

References

Sources
 Jensen R., Reineke H., Ritter М., Boner К., Lakchardov S., "Monoethylene glycol purification technology from suspensions - the ability to reuse the reactants in the process of extraction of natural gas" Sphere Neftegaz 2 (2010) 
 Forscher der TU Kaiserslautern erfinden Mini-Kläranlage", Komplett water recycling systems 
 Environmental-experts,

External links
 Official site

Construction and civil engineering companies of Germany
Water supply and sanitation in Germany
Construction and civil engineering companies established in 1976
Renewable resource companies established in 1976
German companies established in 1976